Mickaël Lebout (born August 16, 1987) is a French mixed martial artist currently competing in the Lightweight division. A professional since 2011, he has competed in the UFC, M-1 Global, and Cage Warriors.

Mixed martial arts career

Early career
Lebout racked a 13–3 record in the European circuit, claiming PLMMA Welterweight Championship in the process.

Ultimate Fighting Championship
Lebout signed with the UFC to replace the injured Gasan Umalatov on short notice, and faced Sérgio Moraes at UFC Fight Night 64 on April 11, 2015. Lebout lost the bout via unanimous decision.

He was scheduled to make his sophomore appearance against Jake Matthews at UFC Fight Night 72 on July 18, 2015. However, Matthews withdrew from the bout due to an injury and was replaced by Teemu Packalén. Lebout won the fight via unanimous decision.

Next he faced Stevie Ray at UFC Fight Night 76 on October 24, 2015, losing the bout via unanimous decision. Subsequently, he was released from the promotion.

Post-UFC career
After the release, Lebout returned to the European circuit, amassing a record of 2–2–1 before taking on Ryan Scope for the vacant BAMMA World Lightweight Championship at BAMMA 33 on December 15, 2017. He lost the fight via split decision.

M-1 Global
He then signed with M-1 Global, racking a record of 3–1 before challenging Roman Bogatov for the M-1 Global Lightweight Championship at M-1 Challenge 104 on August 30, 2019. He lost the bout via technical knockout stemming from an injury.

Other European circuit
After the unsuccessful title shot Lebout headlined French MMAGP event against João Bonfim on October 8, 2020. He won the bout via modified omoplata.

Despite signing with ARES FC in June 2020, Lebout was then slated to challenge Bruno Machado for the UAE Warriors Lightweight Championship at UAE Warriors 15 on January 15, 2021. However, Lebout failed to make contracted weight, thus the championship was removed from the bout. Lebout lost the fight via unanimous decision.

Lebout faced Gábor Boráros on September 11, 2021 at OKTAGON 27. He won the bout via unanimous decision.

After winning a bout against Kevin Ruart at Octofight: Volume 4 via split decision, Lebout faced Karl Amoussou on December 8, 2022 at Ares FC 10, winning the bout via unanimous decision.

Championships and accomplishments
PLMMA
PLMMA Welterweight Champion (one time; former)
One successful title defense

Mixed martial arts record

|-
|Win
|align=center| 23–11–2 (1)
|Karl Amoussou
|Decision (unanimous)
|Ares FC 10
|
|align=center|3
|align=center|5:00
|Paris, France
|
|-
|Win
|align=center| 22–11–2 (1)
|Kevin Ruart
|Decision (split)
|Octofight: Volume 4
|
|align=center|3
|align=center|5:00
|Marseille, France
|
|-
|Win
|align=center| 21–11–2 (1)
|Gábor Boráros
|Decision (unanimous)
|OKTAGON 27
|
|align=center|3
|align=center|5:00
|Bratislava, Slovakia
|
|-
| Loss
| align=center| 20–11–2 (1)
| Bruno Machado
| Decision (unanimous)
| UAE Warriors 15
| |
| align=center| 3
| align=center| 5:00
| Abu Dhabi, United Arab Emirates
| 
|-
| Win
| align=center| 20–10–2 (1)
| João Bonfim
| Submission (omoplata)
| MMA Grand Prix 1
| |
| align=center| 1
| align=center| N/A
| Paris, France
| 
|-
| Loss
| align=center|
| Roman Bogatov
| TKO (shoulder injury)
| M-1 Challenge 104 - Bogatov vs. Lebout
| |
| align=center| 3
| align=center| 5:00
| Orenburg, Russia
| 
|-
| Win
| align=center| 19–9–2 (1)
| Alik Albogachiev
| Submission (rear-naked choke)
| M-1 Challenge 101 - Prikaza vs. Rakhmonov
| |
| align=center| 2
| align=center| 2:50
| Almaty, Kazakhstan
| 
|-
| Win
| align=center| 18–9–2 (1)
| Alexey Makhno
| Decision (unanimous)
| M-1 Challenge 97 - Bogatov vs. Pereira
| |
| align=center| 3
| align=center| 5:00
| Kazan, Tatarstan, Russia
| 
|-
| Loss
| align=center| 17–9–2 (1)
| Pavel Gordeev
| Decision (split)
| M-1 Challenge 92 - Kharitonov vs. Vyazigin
| |
| align=center| 3
| align=center| 5:00
| Saint Petersburg, Russia
| 
|-
| Win
| align=center| 17–8–2 (1)
| Sergey Faley
| KO (punch)
| M-1 Challenge 89 - Buchinger vs. Krasnikov
| |
| align=center| 1
| align=center| 4:53
| Saint Petersburg, Russia
| 
|-
| Loss
| align=center| 16–8–2 (1)
| Ryan Scope
| Decision (split)
| BAMMA 33: Scope vs. Lebout
| |
| align=center| 3
| align=center| 5:00
| Newcastle, England
| For the vacant BAMMA World Lightweight Championship.
|-
|Draw
|align=center|16–7–2 (1)
|Marcin Bandel
|Draw
|Fight Club Slam 2017
|
|align=center|3
|align=center|5:00
|Leganes, Spain
|
|-
| Win
| align=center| 16–7–1 (1)
| Rashad Muradov
| Decision (unanimous)
| Octogone - Octogone 1
| 
| align=center| 3
| align=center| 5:00
| Marseille, France 
|
|-
| Win
| align=center| 15–7–1 (1)
| Mehdi Dakaev
| Decision (unanimous)
| Gladiator Fighting Arena 5
| 
| align=center| 3
| align=center| 5:00
| Rouen, France 
|
|-
| Loss
| align=center| 14–7–1 (1)
| Tim Wilde
| Decision (unanimous)
| Cage Warriors Fighting Championship 78
| 
| align=center| 3
| align=center| 5:00
| Liverpool, Merseyside, England
|
|-
| Loss
| align=center| 14–6–1 (1)
| Jessin Ayari
| Decision (unanimous)
| German MMA Championship 8
| 
| align=center| 3
| align=center| 5:00
| Castrop-Rauxel, North Rhine-Westphalia, Germany
| 
|-
| Loss
| align=center| 14–5–1 (1)
| Stevie Ray
| Decision (unanimous)
| UFC Fight Night: Holohan vs. Smolka
| 
| align=center| 3
| align=center| 5:00
| Dublin, Leinster, Ireland
| 
|-
| Win
| align=center| 14–4–1 (1)
| Teemu Packalén
| Decision (unanimous)
| UFC Fight Night: Bisping vs. Leites
| 
| align=center| 3
| align=center| 5:00
| Glasgow, Scotland
| 
|-
| Loss
| align=center| 13–4–1 (1)
| Sérgio Moraes
| Decision (unanimous)
| UFC Fight Night: Gonzaga vs. Cro Cop 2
| 
| align=center| 3
| align=center| 5:00
| Kraków, Lesser Poland, Poland
| Welterweight bout
|-
| Win
| align=center| 13–3–1 (1)
| Szymon Dusza
| Decision (unanimous)
| PLMMA 48
| 
| align=center| 3
| align=center| 5:00
| Opole, Poland
| 
|-
| Win
| align=center| 12–3–1 (1)
| Pawel Zelazowski
| Decision (unanimous)
| PLMMA 41
| 
| align=center| 3
| align=center| 5:00
| Legionowo, Poland
| 
|-
| Win
| align=center| 11–3–1 (1)
| Davy Gallon
| TKO (punches)
| SHC 10
| 
| align=center| 2
| align=center| N/A
| Geneva, Switzerland
| 
|-
| Win
| align=center| 10–3–1 (1)
| Albert Odzimkowski
| Submission (rear-naked choke)
| Pro MMA Challenge: Just Fight!
| 
| align=center| 1
| align=center| 4:46
| Lublin, Poland
| 
|-
| Win
| align=center| 9–3–1 (1)
| Jonathan Bosuku
| Submission (kneebar)
| 100% Fight 22
| 
| align=center| 1
| align=center| 1:03
| Aubervilliers, France
| 
|-
| Win
| align=center| 8–3–1 (1)
| Dan Rushworth
| Decision (split)
| OMMAC 20
| 
| align=center| 3
| align=center| 5:00
| Liverpool, Merseyside, England
| 
|-
| Draw
| align=center| 7–3–1 (1)
| Johan Vänttinen
| Draw
| Fight Festival 33
| 
| align=center| 3
| align=center| 5:00
| Helsinki, Finland
| 
|-
| Loss
| align=center| 7–3 (1)
| Kai Puolakka
| Decision (unanimous)
| Cage 22
| 
| align=center| 3
| align=center| 5:00
| Vantaa, Finland
| 
|-
| Loss
| align=center| 7–2 (1)
| Elijah Bokelli
| TKO (doctor stoppage)
| 100% Fight 14
| 
| align=center| 2
| align=center| 0:55
| Levallois-Perret, France
| 
|-
| NC
| align=center| 7–1 (1)
| Nicholas Musoke
| No Contest (judging error)
| Vision FC 5
| 
| align=center| 3
| align=center| 5:00
| Stockholm, Sweden
| 
|-
| Win
| align=center| 7–1
| Leon Kenge
| Decision (split)
| 100% Fight 12
| 
| align=center| 2
| align=center| 5:00
| Paris, France
| 
|-
| Loss
| align=center| 6–1
| Sergei Lomonosov
| Decision (unanimous)
| Lions Fighting Championship 2
| 
| align=center| 3
| align=center| 5:00
| Neuchâtel, Switzerland
| 
|-
| Win
| align=center| 6–0
| Aron Bland
| Submission (armbar)
| Kombat Komplett 5
| 
| align=center| 1
| align=center| 1:16
| Baumholder, Germany
| 
|-
| Win
| align=center| 5–0
| Maxime Maucotel
| Submission (armbar)
| 100% Fight: Contenders 12
| 
| align=center| 1
| align=center| 2:01
| Villepinte, France
| 
|-
| Win
| align=center| 4–0
| Damien Lapilus
| Decision (unanimous)
| 100% Fight: Contenders 12
| 
| align=center| 2
| align=center| 5:00
| Villepinte, France
| 
|-
| Win
| align=center| 3–0
| Yacin Daji
| Submission (armbar)
| 100% Fight: Contenders 12
| 
| align=center| 2
| align=center| 3:49
| Villepinte, France
| 
|-
| Win
| align=center| 2–0
| Benoit Canfora
| Decision (unanimous)
| Pancrace Athletic Challenge
| 
| align=center| 3
| align=center| 5:00
| Sarrebourg, France
| 
|-
| Win
| align=center| 1–0
| Loic Marty
| Submission (rear-naked choke)
| 100% Fight: 100 Percent Fight 5
| 
| align=center| 1
| align=center| 3:59
| Paris, France
|

See also
List of male mixed martial artists

References

External links
 
 
 
 Mickael Lebout at BloodyElbow.com
 Mickael Lebout at MMAjunkie.com
 
 

1987 births
French male mixed martial artists
Lightweight mixed martial artists
Welterweight mixed martial artists
Living people
Place of birth missing (living people)
Ultimate Fighting Championship male fighters